Elmer W. Conti (April 9, 1921 – January 4, 1988) was an American politician and businessman.

Born in Elmwood Park, Illinois, Conti went to Proviso High School. He served in the United States Navy during World War II. Conti went to Western Illinois University. He was in the real estate and insurance business. Conti served on the Elmwood Park Village Board and was the village board president.

Conti was involved with the Republican Party. Conti served in the Illinois House of Representatives from 1957 until 1983. Conti died at his home in Elmwood Park, Illinois.

In 1966, Conti was the target of a political assassination attempt, in which a massive black powder bomb was placed in the garage of his home at 2211 North 77th Ave in Chicago. The blast left a 6-inch deep impression in the concrete floor. No suspect(s) have ever been identified or criminally charged in relation to this incident.

Notes

1921 births
1988 deaths
People from Elmwood Park, Illinois
Military personnel from Illinois
Western Illinois University alumni
Businesspeople from Illinois
Illinois city council members
Mayors of places in Illinois
Republican Party members of the Illinois House of Representatives
20th-century American politicians
20th-century American businesspeople
United States Navy personnel of World War II